Hypochrosis is a genus of moths in the family Geometridae. It was erected by Achille Guenée in 1857.

Description
Palpi usually not reaching beyond frons. Antennae bipectinate (comb like on both sides) in both sexes, the branches in the male longer than in the female. Claspers of the male very large. Foreleg with the process reaching beyond end of tibia and non-dilated hind tibia. Forewings with arched costa towards apex. Vein 3 from before angle of cell and veins 7, 8 and 9 stalked from before upper angle. Veins 10 and 11 stalked, where vein 11 being joined by a bar to vein 12, and sometimes vein 10 connected with veins 8 and 9. Hindwings with vein 3 from before angle of cell.

Species
 Hypochrosis abstractaria Walker, [1863]
 Hypochrosis albodecorata Swinhoe, 1902
 Hypochrosis banakaria Plötz, 1880
 Hypochrosis binexata (Walker, [1863])
 Hypochrosis chlorozonaria Walker, 1860
 Hypochrosis cryptopyrrhata (Walker, [1863])
 Hypochrosis euphyes Prout, 1915
 Hypochrosis flavifusata 
 Hypochrosis hyadaria Guenée, 1857 
 Hypochrosis iris (Butler, 1880)
 Hypochrosis irrorata 
 Hypochrosis praeaurata Prout, 1928
 Hypochrosis pyrrhophaeata (Walker, [1863])
 Hypochrosis rufescens (Butler, 1880)
 Hypochrosis sternaria Guenée, 1857
 Hypochrosis subrufa (Bastelberger, 1908)
 Hypochrosis suffusata Pagenstecher, 1907
 Hypochrosis waterstradti Holloway, 1976

References

External links

Hypochrosini